Oscar Rivera may refer to:
 Oscar López Rivera, Puerto Rican activist and militant
 Oscar García Rivera, Puerto Rican politician, lawyer and activist